Nelavoy Dhinakar (born 10 June 1944) is an Indian judge and former Chief Justice of Jharkhand High Court.

Career
Dhinakar was born in 1944. He passed B.A., B.L. and was enrolled as an advocate on 31 January 1968. Dhinakar practised in the Madras High Court on criminal and constitutional matters. He was appointed additional public prosecutor, special public prosecutor and Government advocate in the High Court in 1977. On 17 October 1994 Dhinakar became permanent judge of the Madras High Court. On 30 November 1994 he was transferred to the Kerala High Court thereafter back to the Madras High Court on 5 March 1999. He also performed as the acting Chief Justice of this High Court. On 4 December 2005 he was appointed the Chief Justice of the Jharkhand High Court after Justice Altamas Kabir. Justice Dhinakar retired on 10 June 2006.

References

1944 births
Living people
Indian judges
Chief Justices of the Jharkhand High Court
Judges of the Madras High Court
Judges of the Kerala High Court
21st-century Indian judges
21st-century Indian lawyers